Ground & Air Equipment is a 1981 role-playing game supplement for Space Opera published by Fantasy Games Unlimited.

Contents
Ground & Air Equipment is the first supplement to Space Opera and covers military hardware and heavy systems, along with aircraft and space fighters.

Reception
William A. Barton reviewed Ground & Air Equipment in The Space Gamer No. 41. Barton commented that "Overall, I would rate Ground and Air Equipment as an indispensable play aid for military inclined Space Opera enthusiasts in spite of its flaws. Those who use Space Marines rules for their miniature play should find it a useful tool as well."

References

Role-playing game supplements introduced in 1981
Space Opera supplements